Clifford 'Cliff' R. Bayer (born August 16, 1964) is an American politician who served as a member of the Idaho Legislature from 2004 to 2019.

Education 
Bayer graduated from Borah High School and earned his Bachelor of Science degree in biology from Boise State University.

Career 
Bayer was elected to the Idaho House of Representatives in 2004 and served until 2012. He served as a member of the Idaho Senate from 2012 to 2-2019. He resigned from the Idaho Senate to serve as chief of staff for Congressman Russ Fulcher.

Elections and appointment

References

External links
Clifford R. Bayer at the Idaho Legislature
 

Place of birth missing (living people)
1964 births
Living people
Boise State University alumni
Republican Party members of the Idaho House of Representatives
People from Boise, Idaho
21st-century American politicians